Vriesea amethystina is a species of tropical epiphyte of the genus Vriesea. It is endemic to southeastern Brazil, known from the States of Espírito Santo and Rio de Janeiro.

Cultivars
 Vriesea 'Crousseana'
 Vriesea 'Gracilis'
 Vriesea 'Warmingii Minor'

References

amethystina
Endemic flora of Brazil
Epiphytes
Plants described in 1884